Party of the Poor may refer to:

Party of the Poor (Republic of the Congo)
Party of the Poor (Mexico)